This article presents a list of the historical events and publications of Australian literature during 1982.

Events
 Thomas Keneally won the 1982 Booker–McConnell Prize for Schindler's Ark
 Rodney Hall (writer) won the 1982 Miles Franklin Award for Just Relations

Major publications

Novels 
 Thea Astley, An Item from the Late News
 Rodney Hall (writer), Just Relations
 Thomas Keneally, Schindler's Ark
 David Malouf, Fly Away Peter
 Gerald Murnane, The Plains 
 Tim Winton, An Open Swimmer

Short story anthologies 
 Beverley Farmer, Snake

Children's and young adult fiction 
 Joan Lindsay, Syd Sixpence
 Jan Ormerod, Moonlight
 Nadia Wheatley, Five Times Dizzy

Poetry 
 Les Murray (poet)
 Equanimities
The Vernacular Republic: Poems 1961–1981

Drama 
 Jack Davis, The Dreamers
 Louis Nowra 
The Prince of Homburg
Royal Show
Spellbound
 David Williamson, The Perfectionist

Non-fiction 
 Patsy Adam-Smith, The Shearers
 Blanche d'Alpuget, Robert J. Hawke: a biography
 Edmund Campion, Rockchoppers: Growing up Catholic in Australia
 Nancy Keesing, Lily on the Dustbin: Slang of Australian Women and Families
 Geoffrey Serle, John Monash: a biography
 Robert Wilson, The Book of Australia

Awards and honours

Officer of the Order of Australia (AO)
 Donald Horne

Member of the Order of Australia (AM)
 R. D. Fitzgerald
 Hal Porter

Births 
A list, ordered by date of birth (and, if the date is either unspecified or repeated, ordered alphabetically by surname) of births in 1982 of Australian literary figures, authors of written works or literature-related individuals follows, including year of death.

 1 January — Craig Silvey, novelist, author of Jasper Jones
 22 November — Alasdair Duncan, author and journalist
22 December — Sarah Holland-Batt, contemporary Australian poet, critic and academic

Unknown date
 Kate Gordon, author of young adult fiction

Deaths 
A list, ordered by date of death (and, if the date is either unspecified or repeated, ordered alphabetically by surname) of deaths in 1982 of Australian literary figures, authors of written works or literature-related individuals follows, including year of birth.
 11 February — Albert Facey, writer, best known as author of A Fortunate Life (born 1894)
 8 October — Joice NanKivell Loch, author, journalist and humanitarian worker (born 1887)
 15 November — Eve Pownall, writer for children and historian (born 1901)

See also 
 1982 in Australia
 1982 in literature
 1982 in poetry
 List of years in literature
 List of years in Australian literature

References

1982 in Australia
Australian literature by year
20th-century Australian literature
1982 in literature